Andy Roberts may refer to:
Andy Roberts (cricketer) (born 1951), West Indian former cricketer
Andy Roberts (musician) (born 1946), English musician
Andy Roberts (footballer) (born 1974), retired English footballer
Andy Roberts (racquetball), played in US Open Racquetball Championships

See also
Andrew Roberts (disambiguation)
Roberts (surname)